Ferdinand Gottschalk (28 February 1858 – 10 November 1944) was an English theatre and film actor. He appeared in 76 films between 1917 and 1938. He was born and died in London, England.

He made his first appearance on the stage in Toronto, Ontario, Canada in 1887 and worked continuously after that date including prominent parts on the New York stage as well as in films. He also wrote and produced plays.

Complete filmography

Please Help Emily (1917) - Herbert Threadgold
My Wife (1918) - Biggy Gore
Dr. Jekyll and Mr. Hyde (1920) - Old Man at table in music hall (uncredited)
Zaza (1923) - Duke de Brissac
Many Happy Returns (1930, Short)
Tonight or Never (1931) - Rudig
Grand Hotel (1932) - Pimenov
The Mask of Fu Manchu (1932) - British Museum Official (uncredited)
The Sign of the Cross (1932) - Glabrio
Grand Slam (1933) - Cedric Van Dorn
Parole Girl (1933) - Taylor
Girl Missing (1933) - Alvin Bradford
The Keyhole (1933) - Brooks' Lawyer
The Warrior's Husband (1933) - Sapiens Sr.
Reunion in Vienna (1933) - Palace Tour Guide (uncredited)
Ex-Lady (1933) - Mr. Herbert Smith
Gold Diggers of 1933 (1933) - Clubman (uncredited)
Horse Play (1933) - Oswald
She Had to Say Yes (1933) - Sol Glass
Midnight Club (1933) - George Rubens
No Marriage Ties (1933) - Perkins Co. Worker (uncredited)
Goodbye Again (1933) - Hotel Manager (scenes deleted)
Berkeley Square (1933) - Mr. Throstle
Female (1933) - Pettigrew
Dancing Lady (1933) - Judge (uncredited)
Bombay Mail (1934) - Governor Sir Anthony Daniels
Long Lost Father (1934) - Lawyer Stewart
Nana (1934) - Finot
Gambling Lady (1934) - Cornelius - Lawyer
Riptide (1934) - Orchestra Leader (uncredited)
I Believed in You (1934) - Musician (uncredited)
Upper World (1934) - Marcus
The Witching Hour (1934) - Dr. von Strohn
Stingaree (1934) - Party Guest (uncredited)
Hollywood Party (1934) - Scientific Pedant (uncredited)
Madame DuBarry (1934) - Lebel
The Notorious Sophie Lang (1934) - Augustus Telfen
One Exciting Adventure (1934) - Jeweler
King Kelly of the U.S.A. (1934) - King Maxmilian of Belgardia
Cleopatra (1934) - Glabrio (scenes deleted)
I Sell Anything (1934) - Barouche
I Am a Thief (1934) - M. Cassiet
Secret of the Chateau (1934) - Chief Inspector Marotte
Sing Sing Nights (1934) - Professor Varney
The Man Who Reclaimed His Head (1934) - Baron de Montford - in Theatre Box (uncredited)
Clive of India (1935) - Old Member
Folies Bergère de Paris (1935) - Perishot
Night Life of the Gods (1935) - Old Man Turner
Les Misérables (1935) - Thenardier
Vagabond Lady (1935) - Mr. 'Higgy' Higginbotham
L'homme des Folies Bergère (1935) - Perichot
Break of Hearts (1935) - Enrico Pazzini
Here Comes the Band (1935) - Armand de Valerie
Red Salute (1935) - League Speaker
The Gay Deception (1935) - Mr. Squires
Three Kids and a Queen (1935) - Dr. Flesig
Peter Ibbetson (1935) - Minor Role (scenes deleted)
The Melody Lingers On (1935) - Da Vigna
The Man Who Broke the Bank at Monte Carlo (1935) - Office Man
I Dream Too Much (1935) - Snobbish Critic (uncredited)
Bunker Bean (1936) - Dr. Meyerhauser
Suzy (1936) - Proprietor of Café Anges (uncredited)
The Garden of Allah (1936) - Hotel Clerk (uncredited)
White Legion (1936) - Dr. Fontaine
The Man I Marry (1936) - Organist
Along Came Love (1936) - Mr. Vincent
That Girl from Paris (1936) - Nikki's Uncle (uncredited)
The Crime Nobody Saw (1937) - John Atherton
Café Metropole (1937) - Monsieur Leon Monnet
Carnival in Paris (1937, Short) - Museum Director
Ali Baba Goes to Town (1937) - Chief Councilor
I'll Take Romance (1937) - Monsieur Ginard
Romance in the Dark (1938) - Pianist (uncredited)
The Adventures of Marco Polo (1938) - Persian Ambassador
Stolen Heaven (1938) - Lubert
Josette (1938) - Papa Le Blanc

References

External links

1858 births
1944 deaths
English male film actors
English male silent film actors
English male stage actors
Male actors from London
19th-century English male actors
19th-century English dramatists and playwrights
19th-century English writers
19th-century English male writers
20th-century English dramatists and playwrights
20th-century English male actors
English male dramatists and playwrights
Writers from London
British expatriate male actors in the United States
20th-century English male writers